Domingos Chan (born September 11, 1970 in Macau) is a former Macanese professional football player who played as a goalkeeper. He retired in 2017.

References

External links
 
 

1970 births
Living people
Macau footballers
Macau international footballers
Association football goalkeepers
G.D. Lam Pak players
C.D. Monte Carlo players
Chan, Domingos
Hong Kong First Division League players
Expatriate footballers in Hong Kong
Hong Kong League XI representative players